Ričardas Tamulis (22 July 1938 – 22 April 2008) was an amateur Lithuanian welterweight boxer who won the European title in 1961, 1963 and 1965 and an Olympic silver medal in 1964.

Tamulis took up boxing in 1953 and won the Soviet welterweight title in 1959, 1961–62, 1964 and 1966, placing third in 1963 and 1967. He retired in 1967 with a record of 243 wins in 257 bouts and later coached boxers at his native club Žalgiris Kaunas. In the 1990s he was also active in Lithuanian politics. He died aged 69 after falling from an eighth-floor balcony.

References

1938 births
2008 deaths
Lithuanian male boxers
Olympic boxers of the Soviet Union
Olympic silver medalists for the Soviet Union
Boxers at the 1964 Summer Olympics
Sportspeople from Kaunas
Sportspeople from Jonava
Olympic medalists in boxing
Lithuanian Sportsperson of the Year winners
Soviet male boxers
Medalists at the 1964 Summer Olympics
Deaths from falls
Welterweight boxers
Burials at Petrašiūnai Cemetery